Saint-Benoît is a commune in the Vienne department in the Nouvelle-Aquitaine region in western France. It is a southern suburb of Poitiers.

Population

International relations

Saint-Benoît is twinned with:
 Cookham, United Kingdom

See also
Communes of the Vienne department

References

Communes of Vienne